Suslonger (Süzleŋer) is an urban locality (an urban-type settlement) in Zvenigovsky District of the Mari El Republic, Russia. As of the 2010 Census, its population was 3,161.

History
Urban-type settlement status was granted to it in 1942.

Administrative and municipal status
Within the framework of administrative divisions, the urban-type settlement of Suslonger, together with one rural locality (the settlement of Mochalishche), is incorporated within Zvenigovsky District as Suslonger Urban-Type Settlement (an administrative division of the district). As a municipal division, Suslonger Urban-Type Settlement is incorporated within Zvenigovsky Municipal District as Suslonger Urban Settlement.

References

Notes

Sources

Urban-type settlements in the Mari El Republic